The following is a list of programming, past and present, which has been carried by CITV, the children's television strand of ITV in the United Kingdom, both in the form of the programming block carried from 3 January 1983 to 2006, and on the separate CITV digital channel since 11 March 2006. More details about both the past programming block and current channel are contained within the CITV article.

Current programming

Original

Animated
 Mr. Bean: The Animated Series (2002-2004, 2014-present)
 The Rubbish World of Dave Spud
 Thunderbirds Are Go
 Dodo
 Lloyd of the Flies

Live-action
 Spy School
 Dare Master
 HOW
 Don't Unleash the Beast
 Project Z
 Makeaway Takeaway
 Mini Movies
 Ted's Top 10

Acquired

Animated
 The Buck and The Buddy
 50/50 Heroes
 Be Cool, Scooby-Doo
 Chuck's Choice 
 Craig of the Creek
 Dorg Van Dango
 DC Super Hero Girls
 Teen Titans Go! 
 Mighty Mike
 Mr. Magoo
 Inspector Gadget (2015 Series)
 The Epic Tales of Captain Underpants
 Jurassic World: Camp Cretaceous
Scooby-Doo! Mystery Incorporated
Scooby-Doo and Guess Who?
Shaggy & Scooby-Doo Get a Clue!
Tata & Kuma

Live-action
 Drop Dead Weird
 Detention Adventure
 Overlord and the Underwoods

Signed Stories
Signed Stories was created by ITV SignPost – ITV’s centre of excellence for multi-platform British Sign Language services – as a resource for deaf children and their families, and for teachers of deaf children. The £1.5million initiative was delivered with some of the world’s leading publishers, as part of the company’s corporate and social responsibility plan to give deaf children access to the best children’s books in their native sign language.

The free website www.signedstories.com has grown in popularity with deaf and hearing children, children with special educational needs and those learning English as a second language – it’s now used by hundreds of thousands of children around the world, at school and in the home.

Former programming

 7T3
 24Seven
 101 Dalmatians: The Series
 Action Force
 Action Stations! 
 Adam's Family Tree
 Adventures from the Book of Virtues 
 Disney's Adventures of the Gummi Bears 
 Adventures of Sonic the Hedgehog
 Adventures on Kythera
 Adventure Time
 Aladdin
 Albie
 ALF
 ALF: The Animated Series
 Alias the Jester
 All Grown Up!
 Allsorts/Gigglish Allsorts
 Almost Naked Animals 
 Alphabet Castle
 American Dragon: Jake Long
 Angelina Ballerina
 Animal Spies!
 Animal Stories
 Animals in Action
 Animaniacs (Original series)
 Annabel's Kitchen
 Archibald the Koala
 Are You Afraid of the Dark?
 Art Attack
 As Told by Ginger
 Astro Farm
 A.T.O.M. 
 Atomic Betty (2006–2012)
 Aubrey
 Avatar: The Last Airbender
 Avenger Penguins
 Babar and the Adventures of Badou
 Baby Huey
 Baby Looney Tunes
 Back to the '50s
 Back to the Future
 The Bagel and Becky Show
 Bad Influence!
 Bakugan (2009)
 Bamse Bear
 Bananas in Pyjamas (1992)
 Bangers and Mash 
 Barking!
 Batfink
 Batman
 Batman Beyond 
 Batman: The Animated Series
 Batman: The Movie
 Beany and Cecil
 Bear Grylls' Survival School
 Beast Wars: Transformers
 Beetlejuice
 Behind the Bike Sheds
 Bel's Boys
 Bellamy's Bugle
 Ben 10 (2005 series)
 Ben 10 (2016 series) (now on Cartoon Network)
 Bertha
 Bernard's Watch 
 Bertie the Bat 
 Beyblade: Metal Fusion 
 Big Bad Beetleborgs
 Big Bag (UK Version)
 Big Meg, Little Meg
 Biker Mice from Mars
 Bill the Minder
 Bimble's Bucket 
 Bionic Six
 Bird Back
 Birdman and the Galaxy Trio
 Black Hole High
 Blazing Dragons
 Blinky Bill
 Blips
 Bo on the Go
 Bobobobs
 Bobby's World
 Boblins
 Bookaboo
 Bonkers
 Boohbah
 Bounty Hamster
 Brand Spanking New Doug
 Bratz 
 Brill
 Brilliant Creatures
 Budgie the Little Helicopter
 But Can You Do It on TV
 Butt-Ugly Martians 
 Buttercup Buskers
 Butterfingers
 Button Moon
 C.A.B.
 Calimero
 Camp Lazlo
 Canimals
 Cape-to-Cape Challenge
 Captain Mack
 Captain N: The Game Master
 Captain Planet and the Planeteers
 Captain Simian & the Space Monkeys
 Captain Star
 Captain Zed and the Zee Zone
 Cardcaptors 
 Caribou Kitchen
 Catweazle
 CBTV
 Challenge of the GoBots
 Chatterbox
 Chatterhappy Ponies
 Children of the Dog Star
 Children's Ward
 Chip 'n Dale Rescue Rangers
 Chish 'n' Fips
 Chocky 
 Chocky's Challenge 
 Chocky's Children 
 Chorlton and the Wheelies
 Chowder 
 Chris Cross
 Chums
 CITV White Knuckle Tour
 City Tails
 Clueless
 C.L.Y.D.E.
 Cockleshell Bay
 Coconuts
 Code Lyoko (2006–2008, season 1 only)
 Comin' Atcha!
 Cone Zone
 Construction Site
 Cool Stuff Collective
 C.O.P.S.
 Cosmic Quantum Ray
 Count Duckula
 Courage the Cowardly Dog
 Cow and Chicken
 Crazy Cottage
 Creepy Crawlies
 Crystal Tipps and Alistair
 Cubeez
 Curious George 
 Cuthbert's Diary
 Danger Mouse
 Danger: Marmalade at Work
 Dangerville
 Danny Phantom
 Darkwing Duck 
 Dastardly and Muttley in their Flying Machines
 Dave the Barbarian
 Deadtime Stories
 Delicious
 Delta Wave 
 Dennis the Menace
 Denver, the Last Dinosaur
 Dexter's Laboratory 
 Dig and Dug 
 Digimon Adventure
 Digimon Adventure 02 
 Digimon Fusion
 Digimon Tamers (2002)
 Dink, the Little Dinosaur
 Dino Dana
 Dinosaur King
 Dinosaurs
 Do It
 Doctor Snuggles
 Dodger, Bonzo and the Rest 
 Dog and Duck 
 Dogtanian and the Three Muskehounds
 Don't Eat the Neighbours (2002)
 Don't Try This at Home
 Donald Duck
 Dora the Explorer 
 Dork Hunters from Outer Space (now on London Live)
 Dr. Zitbag's Transylvania Pet Shop (1994–1998)
 Dramarama
 Draw Your Own Toons
 Dream Street
 DuckTales (1987–1995)
 Eddy and the Bear (2005–2008)
 Educating Marmalade
 Eliminator
 Emlyn's Moon (1990)
 Emu
 EMU TV
 Emu's All Live Pink Windmill Show (1983–1989)
 Emu's World
 Engie Benjy (2002–2014)
 Erasmus Microman (1988–1989)
 Escape from Jupiter
 Eugenie Sandler P.I. (2002)
 Even Stevens (2009–2012)
 Extreme Ghostbusters
 Eye of the Storm (1993)
 Fanboy and Chum Chum 
 Fangbone!
 Fantastic Four: World's Greatest Heroes (2007–2008)
 Fantomcat (1995–1996)
 Feel the Fear
 Fender Bender 500
 Feodor
 Fetch the Vet
 Fievel's American Tails
 Figaro Pho
 Finders Keepers
 Finger Tips
 Fireman Sam (2009–2012)
 Fish Hooks
 Five Minute Wonder
 Flash Gordon
 Fleabag Monkeyface
 Flicks (1984–1987)
 Follow Your Nose (1992)
 Foster's Home for Imaginary Friends (2008)
 Four Eyes! (2008–2009)
 Foxbusters
 Fraggle Rock (January 1984-August 1990)
 Freetime (1981–1985)
 From the Top!
 Fun House (1989–1999)
 Fun Song Factory (October 2004-June 2010)
 Funny-Looking Strange Animals
 Galaxy High (1986–1994)
 Garbage Pail Kids
 Garfield & Friends (1989–2002)
 Gargoyles (1994–1997)
 Generator Rex
 Captain Scarlet
 Get Wet (1997–1998)
 Giggly Bitz
 Girls in Love (2003–2005)
 Gladiators: Train to Win (1995–1998)
 Glen Murphy's Mob (1982–1985)
 Go Getters (1989–1996)
 Go Wild
 Goggle Watch
 Good Morning, Miss Bliss
 Good Luck Charlie (2012)
 Goof Troop
 Goofy
 Gormiti (2010–2019)
 Gormiti
 Gravity Falls (2013)
 Grim Tales (1989–1991)
 Grizzly Tales for Gruesome Kids
 Grotbags (1991–1993)
 Gypsy Girl (2001)
 Halfway Across the Galaxy and Turn Left
 Handy Manny (2010–2011)
 Hang On
 Harry and the Wrinklies
 Harry Hill's Shark Infested Custard
 Harry's Mad (1993–1996)
 Hattytown Tales
 H2O: Just Add Water= 
 He-Man and the Masters of the Universe (1983–1989)
 He-Man and the Masters of the Universe (2002)
 Help! I'm a Teenage Outlaw
 Henry's Leg (1986)
 Hercules (1999–2003)
 Hero 108
 Hey Arnold!
 Hi-5 (UK) 
 Higglytown Heroes 
 Hills End 
 Hilltop Hospital 
 Hold Tight 
 Horrible Histories
 Horrid Henry (now on Nicktoons and Nickelodeon, returning in 2023)
 Hot Dog
 Hotel Transylvania: The Series (2017–2021)
 House of Anubis
 House of Mouse
 How 2 
 How Dare You
 Hulk and the Agents of S.M.A.S.H. (2013-2015)
 Hulk Hogan's Rock 'n Wrestling
 Huntik: Secrets & Seekers
 The Hurricanes
 Huxley Pig 
 I Am Weasel
 I Can Do That! (1988–1991)
 Iggy Arbuckle (2008)
 In the House with Cleopatra and Friends
 Inazuma Eleven (2010–2012, seasons 1 and 2 only)
 Inspector Gadget
 Invader Zim (2002–2004)
 It's a Mystery (renamed Mystery in 2002)
 It's Punky Brewster
 It's Stardust (1989–1990)
 Jabberjaw
 Jackson Pace: The Great Years (1990)
 Jacob Two-Two (2005–2011)
 Jake and the Neverland Pirates 
 Jamboree
 James Bond Jr.
 James the Cat
 Jamie and the Magic Torch
 Jay's World
 Jellikins
 Jem (1986–1994)
 Jessie (2013–2016)
 Jim Henson's Mother Goose Stories
 Jim Jam and Sunny
 Johnny and the Dead
 Johnny Ball Reveals All
 Johnny Bravo
 JoJo's Circus (2005–2006)
 Josie Smith
 Jumanji
 Jungle Cubs
 Jungle Junction
 Jungle Run (1999–2006)
 Junglies
 Just for the Record (1989–1991)
 Just Us
 Justice League (2004)
 K.C. Undercover
 KaBlam!
 Kangaroo Creek Gang
 Kappatoo
 Kellyvision
 Kenny the Shark (2004-2011)
 Kid vs. Kat (2009-2011)
 Kim Possible
 King Arthur's Disasters
 Kipper (1997–2006)
 Knight School (1997–1998)
 Knightmare (1987–1994)
 Krankies Television
 Kung Fu Dino Posse
 Lan Jam (2003)
 Lavender Castle (1999–2000)
 Legion of Super Heroes (2008)
 Lego Ninjago
 Lego Star Wars: The Freemaker Adventures
 Let's Pretend (1982–1988)
 Let's Roll with Roland Butter (2004)
 Life Force
 Little Big Mouth
 Little Dracula
 Little Einsteins (2007–2008)
 Little Ghosts
 Little Grey Rabbit
 Little Monsters (2001)
 Little Mouse on the Prairie
 Lizzie McGuire (2009–2012)
 Lloyd of the Flies
 Looney Tunes/Merrie Melodies (2015)
 Mad4It (1998–2000)
 Madame Gusto's Circus
 Madeline
 Magic Adventures of Mumfie (1994)
 Magic with Everything (1998)
 Magical DoReMi (2006–2007)
 Make It Pop
 Mary-Kate and Ashley in Action! (2002)
 Massive Monster Mayhem
 Masked Rider
 Matt Hatter Chronicles
 Matt's Million
 Max & Shred
 Max Steel (2000–2001)
 Maxie's World (1987–1995)
 Mech-X4
 Meeow! (moved to STV)
 Meg and Mog (2003)
 Mega Mick (2012–2013)
 Megamania (1991–1992)
 Men in Black: The Series
 Merlin the Magical Puppy
 Mickey Mouse
 Mickey Mouse Clubhouse (2007–2013)
 Miffy and Friends
 Miffy
 Milo Murphy's Law
 Mighty Ducks: The Animated Series
 Mighty Max
 Mighty Morphin Power Rangers (now on Trace Vault)
 Mike and Angelo (1989–2000)
 Mission Employable
 Mister T
 Molly's Gang
 Monster Tails
 Monsuno
 Mopatop's Shop  (1999–2003, 2006–2009)
 Mork & Mindy
 Moschops
 Motormouth
 Mr. Fixit (1989)
 Mr Majeika (1988–1990)
 Mr. Men and Little Miss
 Mr. Rossi
 Mucha Lucha! (2004–2005)
 Mumble Bumble
 Mummies Alive!
 Muppet Babies (Original series)
 My Goldfish is Evil! (2008–2013)
 My Gym Partner's a Monkey
 My Knight and Me
 My Life as a Popat (2004–2007)
 My Little Pony
 My Parents Are Aliens (1999–2017)
 My Pet Monster
 My Phone Genie
 Mysticons
 Name That Toon
 Naughty Naughty Pets
 Nellie the Elephant (1990)
 Nerds and Monsters
 Nightmare Ned (1998)
 Nini's Treehouse
 Ninja Turtles: The Next Mutation
 Noddy (1975 Version)
 Oasis
 Oban Star-Racers
 Oggy and the Cockroaches (1998-2002)
 Oh, Mr. Toad (1990)
 Old Bear Stories
 Olly the Little White Van
 Om Nom Stories
 On Safari 
 Once Upon a Time... Life
 Once Upon a Time... Space
 Orm and Cheep
 Oscar and Friends
 Out of Sight
 Out of This World
 OWL/TV
 Ox Tales
 Ozzie the Owl
 Pac-Man
 Paddington Bear
 Paddington Bear (1989 series)
 Palace Hill (1988–1991)
 Panic Station
 Pat & Stan
 PB&J Otter
 Peep and the Big Wide World 
 Penny Crayon
 Pepper Ann
 Pet Alien 
 Petswap 
 Phineas and Ferb (2008–2012)
 Phoenix Hall
 Pinky and the Brain
 Pirate Islands
 Pixie and Dixie
 Planet Sketch 
 Plastic Man
 Playbox
 Pluto
 Pocoyo (2005–2008)
 Pokémon (1999–2020)
 Police Academy
 Polterguests
 Pongwiffy
 Poochini 
 Poparound
 Poppy Cat (2011–2014)
 Pororo the Little Penguin (2008–2009)
 Potamus Park
 Potatoes & Dragons (2004–2007)
 Pound Puppies
 Power Rangers (Zeo-RPM)
 Press Gang (1989–1993)
 Preston Pig
 Prove It!
 Pump It Up
 Punky Brewster
 A Pup Named Scooby-Doo (1989–1995)
 Quack Pack
 Ragdolly Anna
 Rainbow (1972–1997)
 Ralf the Record Rat
 Rated A for Awesome
 Rats Tales
 Razzmatazz
 ReBoot (1997–2000)
 Recess (1998–2002; 2006-2007)
 Redakai (2011–2013)
 Rescue Robots (2003)
 Revolting Animals
 Richie Rich
 Ripley and Scuff (2002–2003)
 Robozuna
 Robotboy (2006)
 Rocky and the Dodos (1998–1999)
 Rocky Hollow
 Rod 'n' Emu (1991)
 Rod, Jane and Freddy (1981–1991)
 Roland Rat
 Rolf's Cartoon Club (1989–1993)
 Rosie and Jim (September 1990–July 2004)
 Round the Bend (1989–1991)
 Rub-a-Dub-Dub (1983–1984)
 Rubbish, King of the Jumble (1992–1994)
 Rugrats (2005–2006)
 Runaway Bay
 Running Loose (1986)
 Rupert (1994–1999, 2003, 2005-2006)
 S Club TV
 Sabrina the Teenage Witch (1996 TV series) (1997–2007)
 Sabrina, the Animated Series (1999–2007)
 Sabrina's Secret Life (2005–2007)
 Sailor Moon
 Sailor Sid
 SamSam
 Sammy's Story Shop
 Samson Superslug
 Samurai Pizza Cats
 Santo Bugito
 Satellite City (1989)
 Saved by the Bell
 Scary Sleepover (2004)
 Sci-Bots (1978)
 Scooby-Doo and Scrappy-Doo
 Scooby-Doo, Where Are You!
 Scratch & Sniff's Den of Doom (2007)
 Sesame Street (1986-1999) (Aired on Channel 4 from 1987 to 2001)
 Sharp Practice (1998)
 She-Ra: Princess of Power
 Sherlock Holmes in the 22nd Century
 Shuriken School (2006)
 Sign a Story
 Silverhawks
 Sir Gadabout: The Worst Knight in the Land (2002–2003)
 Sitting Ducks (2002–2003)
 Skyland
 Slim Pig
 Slow Norris
 Small Wonder (1985)
 Snap
 Snug and Cozi (1996–1997)
 Soli & Mo's Nature Show
 Sonic SatAM
 Sonic Underground
 Sonic X
 Sooty 2001-2004 
 Sooty 2011 (Currently on LittleBe)
 Sooty & Co.
 Sooty Heights
 Sooty's Amazing Adventures (1996–1997)
 Space Ghost
 Spatz
 Special Agent Oso
 Spellbinder
 Spice Girls (Documentary)
 Spider-Man and his Amazing Friends
 Spider-Woman
 Spiral Zone
 Spirit Bay
 Splash
 SpongeBob SquarePants (2002–2012) (Currently on Nickelodeon and Nicktoons)
 Spooks of Bottle Bay (1993–1995)
 Stanley 
 Stanley's Dragon
 Starfinder 
 STARStreet 
 Starstrider 
 Sticky
 Storybook International
 Strawberry Shortcake
 Street Sharks
 Streetwise 
 Sonny With A Chance (2012-2014)
 Sunny's Ears (1997)
 Sunnyside Up
 Super 4
 Super Mario World
 Super Robot Monkey Team Hyperforce Go!
 Supergran
 Superman (1988)
 Superman: The Animated Series (1997-2000)
 Supernormal (2007-2011)
 Sweat (1997, 2001)
 T-Bag (1985–1992, 2013)
 A Tale of Two Toads
 Tales from the Cryptkeeper
 Tales from Fat Tulip's Garden (1985–1987)
 Tales from the Poop Deck
 Tales from St. Tiggywinkles
 TaleSpin
 Tati's Hotel
 Taz-Mania (1992–1996)
 Teddybears
 Teen Angel
 Teenage Mutant Ninja Turtles (2003-2008)
 Teenage Mutant Ninja Turtles (2013-2014) (now on S4C and Nicktoons)
 Telebugs (1986–1987)
 Terrahawks
 Terror Towers (1994–1996)
 That's So Raven (2003-2006)
 The Addams Family (1964)
 The Adventures of Batman
 The Adventures of Captain Pugwash
 The Adventures of Captain Zeelig
 The Adventures of Dawdle the Donkey
 The Adventures of the Galaxy Rangers
 The Adventures of Grady Greenspace
 The Adventures of Hyperman
 The Adventures of Jimmy Neutron: Boy Genius (2002-2006)
 The Adventures of Paddington Bear
 The Adventures of Parsley
 The Adventures of Portland Bill
 The Adventures of Sinbad
 The Adventures of Spot the Dog
 The Adventures of Teddy Ruxpin
 The Adventures of Tintin
 The All Electric Amusement Arcade
 The Amazing Adrenalini Brothers
 The Amazing Spider-Man
 The Angry Beavers
 The Animal Shelf
 The Aquabats! Super Show!
 The Avengers: Earth's Mightiest Heroes (2011-2014)
 The Baby Huey Show
 The Backyardigans ( 2005-2009)
 The Baskervilles
 The Beano's Dennis the Menace and Gnasher Show
 The Big Bang (1996-2004)
 The Big Garage
 The Blobs
 The Blunders
 The Book Tower
 The Care Bears
 The Cat in the Hat Knows a Lot About That!
 The Centurions
 The Charmings
 The Chestnut Soldier
 The Dinosaur Trail (1983)
 The Dreamstone (1990–1995)
 The Famous Jett Jackson
 The Fantastic Voyages of Sinbad the Sailor
 The Fairly OddParents
 The Flintstone Comedy Hour
 The Flintstone Comedy Show
 The Flintstones
 The Flockton Flyer
 The Forgotten Toys
 The Fugitives
 The Geeks
 The Gemini Factor (1987)
 The Get-Along Gang
 The Ghost of Faffner Hall (1989)
 The Giblet Boys (2005-2015)
 The Giddy Game Show (1985-1987)
 The Gingerbread Man
 The Greatest Adventure: Stories from the Bible
 The Haunted School
 The Haunted Hathaways
 The Herbs
 The Hot Rod Dogs and Cool Car Cats (1995–1996) (Repeated In Scotland On STV In 2006)
 The Ink Thief
 The Jetsons
 The King Kong Show
 The Krazy Kitchen
 The Legend of Tarzan
 The Legend of Zelda
 The Legends of Treasure Island (1993–1995)
 The Little Bang
 The Little Green Man
 The Little Mermaid (1992–2000)
 The Littlest Hobo
 The Lodge (1993–1994)
 The Looney Tunes Show
 The Magic Crown (1991, translation of La corona mágica)
 The Magic House
 The Magic School Bus
 The Moomins
 The Munsters
 The Muppet Show
 The Mystic Knights of Tir Na Nog
 The Neverending Story
 The New Addams Family (1998)
 The New Adventures of Batman
 The New Adventures of Flash Gordon
 The New Adventures of He-Man (1990-1992)
 The New Adventures of Robin Hood
 The New Adventures of Superman
 The New Adventures of Winnie the Pooh
 The New Archies
 The New Batman Adventures
 The New Scooby-Doo Mysteries
 The New Worst Witch (2005-2006)
 The Oz Kids
 The Parkies (1994)
 The Paz Show
 The Plucky Duck Show
 The Pondles
 The Powerpuff Girls (2016)
 The Quick Trick Show (1998–2002)
 The Raggy Dolls (1986–1994)
 The Ratties (1987–1993)
 The Real Ghostbusters
 The Return of Dogtanian
 The Riddlers (1989–1998)
 The Rottentrolls (1996–2000)
 Rub-a-Dub-Tub
 The Ruff & Reddy Show
 The Saddle Club
 The Scoop
 The Secret World of Polly Flint (1987)
 The Shnookums and Meat Funny Cartoon Show
 The Shoe People (1987)
 The Singing Kettle (1995-2001)
 The Sleepover Club
 The Snow Spider (1988)
 The Sooty Show
 The Star Fleet
 The Storyteller
 The Story Store
 The Super Mario Bros. Super Show
 The Sylvester and Tweety Mysteries (1996–2003)
 The Tomorrow People
 The Trap Door (1986–1987)
 The Treacle People (1995)
 The Twisted Tales of Felix the Cat
 The Wall Game (1985–1986)
 The Wannabes
 The Water Trolley
 The Wind in the Willows (1984–1987)
 The Winjin Pom
 The Wombles (1973)
 The Wombles (1996)
 The Wonderful Wizard of Oz (1989–1990)
 The World of David the Gnome
 The Worst Witch (1998–2001)
 The Worst Witch (film)
 The Wuzzles
 The Yuk Show (2004)
 Thomas the Tank Engine and Friends (1984–1992, 2003–2005)
 Three Seven Eleven
 Thumbs Up
 Tickety Boo (1997)
 Tickle on the Tum (1984–1988)
 Timbuctoo (1998–2000)
 Time Riders (1991)
 Timmy Towers (1997–2002)
 Timon & Pumbaa (1995–1999)
 Tiny Planets (2002–2003)
 Tiny Toon Adventures: How I Spent My Vacation
 Tiny Toon Adventures
 Titch (1997–2002)
 Tom & Jerry Kids (1991–1997)
 Tom and Vicky (1998–1999)
 ToonMarty
 Top Ten of Everything (1998–2000)
 Topsy and Tim
 Totally Spies! (2004-2009)
 Tots TV (1993–1998)
 Toucan Tecs (1990)
 Towser (1984–1988)
 Tractor Tom
 Transformers: Armada (2003)
 Transformers: Cybertron (2004)
 Transformers: Energon (2005)
 Transformers: Robots in Disguise
 Tricky TV (2005–2010; reran until 2015)
 Truckers (1992)
 Tube Mice (1988)
 TUGS (1989)
 Tumbledown Farm (1988–1989)
 Turtle Island
 Tutenstein (2004-2005)
 Twinkle, the Dream Being (1994–1996)
 Twister (2001)
 Two of a Kind (U.S. TV series) (2001)
 Uncle Dad
 Uncle Max (2005–2007)
 Ultimate Spider-Man
 Under the Same Sky (1984–1987)
 Upstairs, Downstairs Bears
 Utterly Brilliant!
 Valley of the Dinosaurs
 Vampires, Pirates & Aliens
 Vicky the Viking
 Victor & Maria
 Victor and Hugo
 Victorious (2011-2014)
 Vinicius and Tom
 Virtually Impossible
 VR Troopers
 Wacaday (1985–1992)
 Wacky Races (1968)
 Wail of the Banshee (1992)
 Walter Melon (1998–1999)
 Watership Down (1999–2001)
 Wavelength
 Waynehead
 Weirdsister College: The Further Adventures of the Worst Witch (2001)
 Welcome to Orty Fou
 What about Mimi? (2003–2004)
 What-a-Mess (1990)
 What's with Andy?
 When Will I Be Famous? (1989)
 Where's Wally?
 Whizziwig (1998–2000)
 Who's Next
 Widget the World Watcher (1992–1993)
 Wil Cwac Cwac
 Wild World
 Wilderness Edge (1992)
 Wilmot (1999–2000, 2003)
 Wimpole Village (1987)
 Windfalls (1988)
 Winx Club (2006–2007)
 Wisdom of the Gnomes
 Wishbone
 Wishfart
 Wizadora (1993–1998)
 Wolf It (1993–1996)
 Wolves, Witches and Giants (1995–2016)
 Woody Woodpecker
 Woof! (1988–1997)
 Worldwise (1984–1986)
 Worst Best Friends (2003)
 Worzel Gummidge Down Under (1987)
 Worzel Gummidge (1979)
 Wowser (1990–1993)
 Wysiwyg (1992)
 X-Men (2011-2012)
 Yoko! Jakamoko! Toto! 
 You Can't Do That on Television
 You'll Never Believe It!
 Young Justice
 Young Krypton (1988–1989)
 Your Mother Wouldn't Like It
 Yu-Gi-Oh!
 Yu-Gi-Oh! 5D's
 Yu-Gi-Oh! GX
 Zig and Zag (1998)
 Zot the Dog
 ZZZap! (1993–2001)

Saturday mornings
9.25am/7.25am on Saturday mornings has traditionally been the slot for CITV's flagship entertainment programme. The programmes were:

 Tiswas (1974–1982)
 The Mersey Pirate (1979)
 No. 73 (1982–1988)
 The Saturday Show (1982–1984)
 Summer Run (1983)
 The Saturday Starship (1984–1985)
 Wide Awake Club (1984–1992)
 Get Fresh (1986–1988)
 Motormouth (1988–1992)
 WAC '90 (1989–1990)
 Ghost Train (1990–1992)
 Top Banana (1990–1991) (TV-AM program not CITV)
 Hey, Hey it's Saturday! (1990–1991) (TV-AM program not CITV)
 TV Mayhem (1991)
 Cartoon World (1991–1992)
 What's Up Doc? (1992–1995)
 Gimme 5 (1993–1994)
 Rise and Shine (1993–1995) (GMTV program not CITV)
   Diggit (1997-2002)
 Scratchy & Co. (1995–1998)
 Telegantic Megavision (1996)
 WOW! (1996)
 Mashed (1997–1998)
 Tricky (1997)
 SMTV Live (1998–2003)
 Ministry of Mayhem/MoM/Holly & Stephen's Saturday Showdown (2004–2006)
 Toonattik (2005-2010, aired in the Breakfast slot)
 Scrambled! (2014–2021, aired in the Breakfast slot)

References

External links

Toonhound

ITV children's television shows
British television-related lists
Lists of television series by network
ITV-related lists